Robert Farle (born 16 February 1950) is a German politician. The former member of the German Communist Party (DKP) joined the Alternative for Germany in 2015. He has been a Member of the German Bundestag for Mansfeld since 2021.

See also 
 List of members of the 20th Bundestag

References 

1950 births

Living people
21st-century German politicians
Members of the Bundestag for Saxony-Anhalt
Members of the Landtag of Saxony-Anhalt
Members of the Bundestag 2021–2025
Members of the Bundestag for the Alternative for Germany